Omega Psi Phi (ΩΨΦ) Grand Conclaves are the fraternity’s official international convention.  Grand Conclaves were originally held annually. At some point in the 1950s or 1960s, the Grand Conclaves were changed to being held every 18 months. After the 75th Grand Conclave in 1986, Grand Conclaves were changed to every two years.

Explanatory Notes

References

Conclaves
Omega Psi Phi